Poio is a municipality in Galicia, Spain in the province of Pontevedra. Poio is located in the North shore of the Ría de Pontevedra, between Sanxenxo and the provincial capital, Pontevedra. The municipality is adjacent with Meaño, Meis, Pontevedra and Sanxenxo and offers a rich fusion of mountain and sea areas.

Tambo island, an uninhabited island located in the middle of the Pontevedra estuary, officially belongs to Poio but it is under the control of the Spanish Navy and disembarkment is not allowed.

Geography
The views also spotlight the Alto de Raxó and Samieira.

Demography
Poio is a dormitory area of the city of Pontevedra. It has a growing market due to its proximity to the urban center (only the Lérez river separates the two municipalities). The parish of San Salvador, the nearest to the city, is the parish that increases the census. The tourism industry has begun to thrive in Raxó and Combarro within the last few years.

Sights 
Sights include the Monastery of San Xoán de Poio, the picturesque fishing village of Combarro with its Hórreos by the sea and several prehistoric rock engraving sites; all declared Bien de Interés Cultural (Heritage of Cultural Interest).

References

Municipalities in the Province of Pontevedra